Fieldsboro is an unincorporated community in New Castle County, Delaware, United States. Fieldsboro is located at the intersection of U.S. Route 13 and Fieldsboro Road, south of Odessa.

History
Fieldsboro's population was 60 in 1890.

References

Unincorporated communities in New Castle County, Delaware
Unincorporated communities in Delaware